Valentina Klemenčič (born 5 February 2002) is a Slovenian handball player for RK Krim and the Slovenian national team.

She represented Slovenia at the 2019 World Women's Handball Championship.

References

External links

Slovenian female handball players
2002 births
Living people
Sportspeople from Kranj
21st-century Slovenian women